The Wasatch Front  is a metropolitan region in the north-central part of the U.S. state of Utah. It consists of a chain of mostly contiguous cities and towns stretched along the Wasatch Range from approximately Santaquin in the south to Logan in the north, and containing the cities of Salt Lake City, Bountiful, Layton, and Ogden.

Geography 
The Wasatch Front is long and narrow. The area's western boundary is formed by Utah Lake in Utah County, the Oquirrh Mountains in Salt Lake County, and the Great Salt Lake in northwestern Salt Lake, Davis, Weber, southeastern Box Elder, and Cache counties.

Along its length, the Wasatch Front never exceeds a width of approximately  because of the natural barriers of lakes and mountains.

Sustained drought in Utah has more recently strained the region's water security and caused the Great Salt Lake level drop to record low levels, and impacting the state’s economy, of which the Wasatch Front constitutes 80%.

Climate 
The Wasatch Front is a semi-arid region at the eastern edge of the Great Basin. Snowfall is common during winter but often melts rapidly. Inversions commonly occur along the Wasatch Front during mid-winter making for very cold temperatures and gloomy conditions lasting for several weeks at times in the valleys, while the higher mountain elevations will experience clear and warmer conditions. Localized lake-effect snowfall from the Great Salt Lake is common in the late Fall and early winter. The first freeze usually occurs in early October in the outlying areas but can occur as late as early November in the inner urban areas. The last freeze can occur broadly between early April and late May.

Summers are generally hot and dry, with the exception of the monsoon season which usually runs from early July through early September when often intense thunderstorms occur.

Population centers 

Several downtown and commercial districts encompass the Wasatch Front, including the Salt Lake City metropolitan area, the Provo-Orem metropolitan area (south of Salt Lake), and the Ogden-Clearfield metropolitan area (north of Salt Lake). Nearly all of the cities within the region are connected by continuous suburban development.

Transportation 

Ogden has served as a major railway hub through much of its history. The First transcontinental railroad was constructed between 1863 and 1869, the tracks reaching Ogden on March 27, 1869. Trains heading east from Ogden must negotiate the highest reaches of eastern Utah, travelling through Weber and Echo Canyons and over the Wasatch Pass at an elevation of 6,792 feet.

Union Pacific has operated the world's most powerful locomotives to haul freight over the Wasatch Mountains between Cheyenne and Ogden, including American Locomotive Company's famous "Big Boys", the world's largest steam locomotive; GE's Gas Turbines known as the "Big Blows" (because of their distinctive sound), the world's most powerful internal combustion locomotive; and GM's "Big Jacks", the most powerful single-unit diesel locomotive type ever built.

Transportation issues within the metropolitan area have been complicated by the narrow north–south orientation of the valley, constrained by the natural barriers on both sides, and the rapid growth of the region.

Other interstates and highways provide transportation routes to local areas within the Wasatch Front. Such transportation routes include Interstate 84 in the Ogden area; the Legacy Parkway (State Route 67) running north–south through western Davis County; Interstate 80 running east–west through Salt Lake City; Interstate 215 (I‑215) circling the inner Salt Lake Valley; the Mountain View Corridor (State Route 85), Bangerter Highway (State Route 154), and State Route 201 to the west of Salt Lake City;  U.S. Route 189 through Provo, and U.S. Route 6 in southern Utah County.

The Utah Transit Authority provides bus and light rail (TRAX) service to most of the urban areas within the Wasatch Front. Additionally, a double-decker commuter rail line FrontRunner, running from North Ogden to Provo is in full operation.

The California Zephyr of Amtrak is the primary rail transport leading in and out of the Wasatch Front, having a station in Salt Lake City and Provo.

Salt Lake City International Airport serves as the primary airport for the region. Ogden-Hinckley Airport and Provo Municipal Airport also provide scheduled commercial air service.

Growth and land use 
Because of the geographical barriers to the east and west, much of the land along the Wasatch Front has been developed.  The region has experienced considerable growth since the 1950s, with its population increasing 308% from 492,374 to 2,051,330. Much of the remaining undeveloped land is rapidly being developed, and local governments have grappled with problems of urban sprawl and other land-use concerns.

The region on the other side of the Wasatch Range, including cities such as Park City, Morgan, Heber City, and Midway is sometimes referred to as the Wasatch Back and has recently shared in the rapid growth of the region.

See also

 Salt Lake City metropolitan area
 Wasatch Back
 Wasatch Fault
 2003 Utah snowstorm
 Payson-Dixon line

References

External links

  Utah Office of Tourism

 
Metropolitan areas of Utah
Regions of Utah
Wasatch Range
Geography of Box Elder County, Utah
Geography of Davis County, Utah
Geography of Juab County, Utah
Geography of Salt Lake County, Utah
Geography of Utah County, Utah
Geography of Weber County, Utah